Incredible Tales (I.T.) is a 2004 Singaporean anthology supernatural horror documentary television series released by MediaCorp, revolving horror stories recounted by Asians in each episode. The series is hosted by Thai actor and model Utt Panichkul, or simply known as Utt during the episodes.

A total of eight seasons were broadcast with the recent season airing on 13 May 2017 and ending on 12 August 2017. A Mandarin dubbed series (Season 1 as ) was also aired after the English version. As of 2019, all eight seasons (as well as the Mandarin dubbed series) were archived in MediaCorp's Video on demand website meWATCH.

Premise
The series features the stories of paranormal encounters by ordinary people in Singapore, inspired by actual encounters submitted directly to the show by viewers, intriguing urban legends with uncertain origins, and published materials by prolific best-selling authors such as Russell Lee (best known for True Singapore Ghost Story) and Goh Sin Tub.

Each half-hour episode features a story or two on the recount of paranormal occurrences in Asia, though the episodes aired that revolve around this episode are reenactment, similar to the other horror anthologies such as Tales from the Crypt and Are You Afraid of the Dark?.

The fifth season marked the first season to air in High-definition television, using a revamped theme tune while the title logo of IT was redesigned to look more transparent from white, and the show's title, Incredible Tales were placed on the bottom left for the first time together. Additionally, filming took place in Philippines for the first time.

Series overview

Episodes

References

2004 Singaporean television series debuts
2017 Singaporean television series endings
2000s horror television series
2010s horror television series
English-language television shows
Horror anthologies
Channel 5 (Singapore) original programming